Kevin "Geordie" Walker (born 18 December 1960) is an English rock musician, best known as the guitarist of post-punk group Killing Joke. His unorthodox style of electric guitar playing is widely acclaimed.

Jimmy Page of Led Zeppelin hailed Walker's guitar sound as "really strong". Peer Kevin Shields of My Bloody Valentine praised Walker's guitar playing, which he described as "this effortless playing producing a monstrous sound".

Life and career
When he was eight years old, Walker was deeply marked by the guitar's sound in the song "Sabre Dance" by Love Sculpture. "I used to go mad when it came on the radio." 
When he was fourteen, Walker's family moved south from Newcastle to Milton Keynes in Buckinghamshire, 45 miles northwest of London. It was during this era that he acquired his nickname due to his northeastern "Geordie" accent (which he has subsequently lost). He decided to learn to play the guitar: "I used to run home from school at about four, lock myself in the bedroom, turn the amp up full, and thrash it till he [his dad] came in. It was a daily ritual". He learnt that it's melody lines as opposed to solos. The first guitar that helped him to find his way was bought in Northampton at Christmas 1973. When his mother saw a Gibson Les Paul in the shop, she suggested he try it in remembrance of a concert she attended with Jimi Hendrix on the bill. After Walker played about two chords, his mother's verdict was: "We'll take it."  He worked at that time, "two real jobs" that allowed him to save money. He then bought another guitar, a Gibson SG Junior.

Walker later moved to London to study architecture and became a founding member of Killing Joke in 1979 when he responded to an advertisement placed by the singer Jaz Coleman. He had never played in a band before. Walker and Coleman have been the only constant members of the group since.

Walker has also been a member of industrial music supergroups Murder, Inc. and The Damage Manual.

In the mid-1990s, Walker lived in Royal Oak, Michigan, a suburb of Detroit with his wife Ginny Kiraly, and his son Atticus. At the time of the recording of  Hosannas from the Basements of Hell  in 2006, he produced UK girl punk rock act Mary-Jane at Faust Studios in Prague. He now resides in Prague, where he cooperates with Studio Faust Records, for recording other artists's music.
.

Influences
Walker cited the band Love Sculpture featuring Dave Edmunds and their sound on the song Sabre Dance because "it used the guitar as a musical instrument to convey an atmosphere, it wasn't normal guitar playing which people feel they have to play, certain rhythms, certain solos, certain scales". Walker also named Siouxsie and the Banshees' debut album The Scream as an influence because their original guitarist John McKay "came out with these chord structures that I found very refreshing".

Style

Walker's tuning of guitar is different. He likes it  to be strung a whole tone lower. "It suits the resonance and the volume of the thing, and you can use heavier strings. I’ve got 58s on the bottom. Basically if I play an E-position chord, it’s D." Walker said that "a guitar has a lot of musical capability, but it has the rhythm as well. As one instrument, I think it has the most pleasing sound, the attack, the rhythm". Concerning his guitar playing, Walker explained: "If you hit a chord and press down on the bridge, it bends all six notes at once, that's probably one of the odder aspects of my technique. If you want to get technical - things like augmented fourths and sevenths have a certain unnerving effect, a bit like a tingle up the spine. I go for a lot of those in my chord structures.

Equipment
His preferred guitar of choice is a hollow-bodied 1952 Gibson ES-295 in gold lacquer: an instrument also previously used by Elvis Presley  sideman Scotty Moore. It is a semi-acoustic guitar, made in 1952, with a trapeze tailpiece. Walker bought it from an old jazzman who played in clubs. He plugged it into the Burman amplifier, "and the sound was there – a full resonance, and totally bell-like with the sustain on it through 250 watts of amplification in stereo. You can feel the thing vibrating, it's a huge sound. I tune the guitar in D (below bottom E) and my strings are really thick, I use an 062 on the bottom, and because of the way I tune the guitar, the strings still have the same response as a normal guitar would. The amplification makes the bottom end sound unreal. [...] the sound of the guitar is a lot sharper, a lot clearer than other ones I've heard."

He has used ADT units made by Bell, one of those on each amplifier : "It's got from a really tight delay to a single short delay, and a pitch bend on it", and Electro Harmonix Memory Man Chorus.

References

Further reading

External links

1958 births
English rock guitarists
English male guitarists
Living people
English punk rock guitarists
British post-punk musicians
English expatriates in the United States
Killing Joke members
Pigface members
People from Chester-le-Street
Murder, Inc. (band) members
The Damage Manual members
Industrial metal musicians
English heavy metal guitarists